Noel Colleran (born 1944 in Mountbellew, County Galway) is an Irish former sportsperson. He played Gaelic football with his local club Mountbellew and was a member of the Galway senior inter-county team in the 1960s and 1970s.

References

1944 births
Living people
Mountbellew Gaelic footballers
Galway inter-county Gaelic footballers